The Cooper Mark I, also known as the T4 (Type 4), was a lightweight sports car, designed, developed, and built by  British manufacturer Cooper in 1947. It was based on the chassis of the open-wheel Cooper 500 chassis, but with enclosed bodywork. It shared many Fiat parts and components, like its predecessor, the original 500. An aluminum panel body covered the tubular space frame chassis. Only one car was ever built, which is still in existence.

References

Cooper racing cars
1940s cars
Cars of England  
Sports cars